Heidi Hossi (born 2 March 1988) is a Finnish curler.

At the national level, she is a five-time Finnish women's champion (2011, 2012, 2013, 2014, 2015) and a four-time junior champion (2005, 2006, 2007, 2008).

Teams

Women's

Mixed

Mixed doubles

References

External links

Living people
1988 births

Finnish female curlers
Finnish curling champions
Place of birth missing (living people)